Separate lists have been created for each letter or new group of letters:
 List of films: J-K
 List of films: L
 List of films: M
 List of films: N-O
 List of films: P
 List of films: Q-R

-